Calamotropha lupatus is a moth in the family Crambidae. It was described by Edward Meyrick in 1932. It is found in India and Iran.

References

Crambinae
Moths described in 1932